Philip Morgan Halpern (born April 17, 1956) is a United States district judge of the United States District Court for the Southern District of New York.

Education

Halpern was born on April 17, 1956, in Derby, Connecticut. He received his Bachelor of Science, magna cum laude, from Fordham University, and his Juris Doctor from Pace University School of Law.

Legal and academic career

Upon graduation from law school, he clerked for Judge Irving Ben Cooper of the United States District Court for the Southern District of New York. He was a managing partner of Collier, Halpern & Newberg, LLP, where his practice focused on commercial, employment, real estate, and securities litigation. From 2016 to 2017, and again in 2019, he was an adjunct professor at the Elizabeth Haub School of Law at Pace University, where he taught "The Anatomy of a Trial: The Burden of Proof."

Federal judicial service

On October 10, 2018, President Donald Trump announced his intent to nominate Halpern to serve as a United States district judge for the United States District Court for the Southern District of New York. On November 13, 2018, his nomination was sent to the Senate. President Trump nominated Halpern to the seat vacated by Judge P. Kevin Castel, who assumed senior status on August 5, 2017.

On January 3, 2019, his nomination was returned to the President under Rule XXXI, Paragraph 6 of the United States Senate. On January 22, 2019, President Trump announced his intent to renominate Halpern for a federal judgeship. His nomination was sent to the Senate the next day. On October 30, 2019, a hearing on his nomination was held before the Senate Judiciary Committee. On November 21, 2019, his nomination was reported out of committee by a 17–5 vote. On February 11, 2020, the Senate voted 75–18 to invoke cloture on his nomination. On February 12, 2020, his nomination was confirmed by a 77–19 vote. He received his judicial commission on February 21, 2020.

References

External links 

1956 births
Living people
21st-century American judges
21st-century American lawyers
Fordham University alumni
Judges of the United States District Court for the Southern District of New York
New York (state) lawyers
Pace University faculty
Pace University School of Law alumni
People from Derby, Connecticut
United States district court judges appointed by Donald Trump